"For sale: baby shoes, never worn." is a six-word story, popularly attributed to Ernest Hemingway, although the link to him is unlikely. It is an example of flash fiction.

Setting 
The claim of Hemingway's authorship originates in an unsubstantiated anecdote about a wager among him and other writers. In a 1991 letter to Canadian humorist John Robert Colombo, science fiction writer Arthur C. Clarke recounts: "He's [Hemingway] supposed to have won a $10 bet (no small sum in the '20s) from his fellow writers. They paid up without a word. ... Here it is. I still can't think of it without crying— FOR SALE. BABY SHOES. NEVER WORN."

History 

The May 16, 1910, edition of The Spokane Press had an article titled "Tragedy of Baby's Death is Revealed in Sale of Clothes." At that time, Hemingway would only have been aged ten, and years away from beginning his writing career.

In 1917, William R. Kane published a piece in a periodical called The Editor where he outlined the basic idea of a grief-stricken woman who had lost her baby and even suggested the title of Little Shoes, Never Worn. In his version of the story, the shoes are being given away rather than sold. He suggests that this would provide some measure of solace for the owner, as it would mean that another baby would at least benefit directly.

By 1921, the story was already being parodied: the July issue of Judge that year published a version that used a baby carriage instead of shoes; there, however, the narrator described contacting the seller to offer condolences, only to be told that the sale was due to the birth of twins rather than of a single child.

The earliest known connection to Hemingway was in 1991, thirty years after the author's death. This attribution was in a book by Peter Miller called Get Published! Get Produced!: A Literary Agent's Tips on How to Sell Your Writing. He said he was told the story by a "well-established newspaper syndicator" in 1974. In 1992, John Robert Colombo printed a letter from Arthur C. Clarke that repeated the story, complete with Hemingway having won $10 each from fellow writers.

This connection to Hemingway was reinforced by a one-man play called Papa by John deGroot, which debuted in 1996. Set during a Life magazine photo session in 1959, deGroot has the character utter the phrase as a means of illustrating Hemingway's brevity. In Playbill, deGroot defended his portrayal of Hemingway by saying, "Everything in the play is based on events as described by Ernest Hemingway, or those who knew him well. Whether or not these things actually happened is something we'll never know truly. But Hemingway and many others claimed they did."

Legacy 
The general concept of trying to tell a story with the absolute minimum of words became known by the general term of flash fiction. The six-word limit in particular has spawned the concept of Six-Word Memoirs, including a collection published in book form in 2008 by Smith Magazine, and two sequels published in 2009.

See also

Iceberg theory

References 

Short stories
Ernest Hemingway